The Small-tooth Dog is an English fairy tale collected by Sidney Oldall Addy in Household Tales and Other Traditional Remains.

It is Aarne-Thompson type 425C.  Others of this type include Beauty and the Beast and The Singing, Springing Lark.

Ruth Manning-Sanders included it in A Book of Magic Animals.

Synopsis

A merchant was attacked by robbers.  A dog came to his aid and then brought him to his home until he recovered.  The merchant offered to give him many marvels, such as a goose that laid golden eggs, but the dog said that he wanted only the merchant's daughter.  The merchant grieved, but he had agreed. He went home, and when a week had gone by, the dog came for the daughter.  He told her to get on his back, she did, and he carried her to his home.

After a month, she wept because she wanted to visit her father.  The dog said that she could, if she stayed no more than three days, but asked what she would call him there.  She said, "A great, foul, small-tooth dog," and he refused to take her.  She begged and said she would call him "Sweet-as-a-Honeycomb," and they set out, but on the way, when they came to a stile, he asked what she would call him, and she said "A great, foul, small-tooth dog," and he carried her back.  A week later, they went again, and she called him "Sweet-as-a-Honeycomb," at the first stile, but "A great, foul, small-tooth dog," at the second, and he carried her back.  A week after that, they set out again, and she called him "Sweet-as-a-Honeycomb" at the stiles.  When they reached the merchant's home, he asked again, and she started to say "A great -- " but thought on how kind he had been to her and said, "Sweeter-than-a-Honeycomb".  He got up on his hind legs, shed his coat, and became a handsome young man, and they married.

Commentary
The urging of her father to marry the beast because he had promised her represents a factor clearly present in arranged marriages.  This tale has been interpreted as symbolically representing an arranged marriage; the bride's revulsion to marrying a stranger being symbolized by his bestial form.

See also

Bearskin
Beauty and the Beast

References

English fairy tales
Books about dogs
Fiction about shapeshifting
ATU 400-459